Baileya multiradiata is a North American species of sun-loving wildflowers native to the deserts of northern Mexico and the Southwestern United States. It has been found in the States of Sonora, Chihuahua, Coahuila, Durango, Aguascalientes, California, Arizona, Nevada, Utah, New Mexico, and Texas.

It blooms from April to October. The seed-like fruit is whitish, with no scales or bristles at the tip.

Although called a desert marigold, it is only a remote relative of the true marigolds of the genus Tagetes.

References

External links
 
 United States Department of Agriculture Plants Profile
 University of Arizona, Arizona Landscaping Species Profile
 

Helenieae
Flora of Northwestern Mexico
Flora of the Southwestern United States
Flora of the California desert regions
Flora of the Sonoran Deserts
Flora of the Chihuahuan Desert
Flora of the Great Basin
Flora without expected TNC conservation status
Plants described in 1848